The 1972–73 Magyar Kupa (English: Hungarian Cup) was the 33rd season of Hungary's annual knock-out cup football competition.

Final

See also
 1972–73 Nemzeti Bajnokság I

References

External links
 Official site 
 soccerway.com

1972–73 in Hungarian football
1972–73 domestic association football cups
1972-73